Maftan (also known as Rūstāy-e Felesţīn) is a village in Ahudasht Rural District, Shavur District, Shush County, Khuzestan Province, Iran. At the 2006 census, its population was 45, in 6 families.

References 

Populated places in Shush County